The Korean language has diverged between North and South Korea due to the length of time that the two states have been separated. Underlying dialectical differences have been extended—in part by government policies, and in part by the isolation of North Korea from the outside world. There are some differences in orthography and pronunciation, and substantial differences in newer vocabulary; whereas the South tends to use loanwords from English, the North tends to use loanwords from Russian or construct compound words.

The Korean Language Society in 1933 made the "Proposal for Unified Korean Orthography", which continued to be used by both Korean states after the end of Japanese rule in 1945. But with the establishments of the Democratic People's Republic of Korea and the Republic of Korea in 1948, the two states have taken on differing policies regarding the language.

Development 
In 1954, North Korea set out the rules for Korean orthography. Although this was only a minor revision in orthography that created little difference from that used in the South, from then on, the standard languages in the North and the South gradually differed more and more from each other.

In the 1960s, under the influence of the Juche ideology, came a big change in linguistic policies in North Korea. On 3 January 1964, Kim Il-sung issued his teachings on "A Number of Issues on the Development of the Korean language", and on 14 May 1966 on the topic "In Rightly Advancing the National Characteristics of the Korean language", from which the "Standard Korean Language" rules followed in the same year, issued by the National Language Revision Committee that was directly under the control of the cabinet.

From then on, more important differences came about between the standard language in the North and the South. In 1987, North Korea revised the aforementioned rules further, and these have remained in use until today. In addition, the rules for spacing were separately laid out in the "Standard Spacing Rules in Writing Korean" in 2000 but have since been superseded by "Rules for Spacing in Writing Korean", issued in 2003.

As with the Korean phonology article, this article uses IPA symbols in pipes  for morphophonemics, slashes  for phonemes, and brackets  for allophones. Pan-Korean romanized words are largely in Revised Romanization, and North Korean-specific romanized words are largely in McCune-Reischauer.

Hangul / Chosŏn'gŭl
The same Hangul / Chosŏn'gŭl letters are used to write the language in the North and the South. However, in the North, the stroke that distinguishes ㅌ  from ㄷ  is written above rather than inside the letter, as is done in the South.

In the South, the vowel digraphs and trigraphs ㅐ , ㅒ , ㅔ , ㅖ , ㅘ , ㅙ , ㅚ , ㅝ , ㅞ , ㅟ , ㅢ , and the consonant digraphs ㄲ , ㄸ , ㅃ , ㅆ , ㅉ , are not treated as separate letters, whereas in the North they are.  Some letters and digraphs have different names in the North and in the South:

The names used in the South are the ones found in the Hunmongjahoe (훈몽자회, 訓蒙字會, published 1527). The names used in the North are formed mechanically with the pattern "letter + 이 + 으 + letter". Also for the tensed consonants, in the South, they are called "double" (쌍- ) consonants, while in the North, they are called "strong" (된- ) consonants.

Sort order
Initial consonants
{|style="text-align:center"
|style="text-align:left"|North:||ㄱ||ㄴ||ㄷ||ㄹ||ㅁ||ㅂ||ㅅ||ㅈ||ㅊ||ㅋ||ㅌ||ㅍ||ㅎ||ㄲ||ㄸ||ㅃ||ㅆ||ㅉ||ㅇ
|-
| ||[k]||[n]||[t]||[l]||[m]||[p]||[s]||[tɕ]||[tɕʰ]||[kʰ]||[tʰ]||[pʰ]||[h]||[k͈]||[t͈]||[p͈]||[s͈]||[tɕ͈]||[∅]
|-
| style="text-align:left" |South:||ㄱ||ㄲ||ㄴ||ㄷ||ㄸ||ㄹ||ㅁ||ㅂ||ㅃ||ㅅ||ㅆ||ㅇ||ㅈ||ㅉ||ㅊ||ㅋ||ㅌ||ㅍ||ㅎ
|-style="text-align:center"
| ||[k]||[k͈]||[n]||[t]||[t͈]||[l]||[m]||[p]||[p͈]||[s]||[s͈]||[∅]||[tɕ]||[tɕ͈]||[tɕʰ]||[kʰ]||[tʰ]||[pʰ]||[h]
|}
Vowels
{|style="text-align:center"
|style="text-align:left"|North:||ㅏ||ㅑ||ㅓ||ㅕ||ㅗ||ㅛ||ㅜ||ㅠ||ㅡ||ㅣ||ㅐ||ㅒ||ㅔ||ㅖ||ㅚ||ㅟ||ㅢ||ㅘ||ㅝ||ㅙ||ㅞ
|-
| ||[a]||[ja]||[ɔ]||[jɔ]||[o]||[jo]||[u]||[ju]||[ɯ]||[i]||[ɛ]||[jɛ]||[e]||[je]||[ø]||[y]||[ɰi]||[wa]||[wɔ]||[wɛ]||[we]
|-
| style="text-align:left" |South:||ㅏ||ㅐ||ㅑ||ㅒ||ㅓ||ㅔ||ㅕ||ㅖ||ㅗ||ㅘ||ㅙ||ㅚ||ㅛ||ㅜ||ㅝ||ㅞ||ㅟ||ㅠ||ㅡ||ㅢ||ㅣ
|-
| ||[a]||[ɛ]||[ja]||[jɛ]||[ʌ]||[e]||[jʌ]||[je]||[o]||[wa]||[wɛ]||[ø]||[jo]||[u]||[wʌ]||[we]||[y]||[ju]||[ɯ]||[ɰi]||[i]
|}
Final consonants
{|style="text-align:center"
|-
| style="text-align:left" |North:||(none)||ㄱ||ㄳ||ㄴ||ㄵ||ㄶ||ㄷ||ㄹ||ㄺ||ㄻ||ㄼ||ㄽ||ㄾ||ㄿ||ㅀ||ㅁ||ㅂ||ㅄ||ㅅ||ㅇ||ㅈ||ㅊ||ㅋ||ㅌ||ㅍ||ㅎ||ㄲ||ㅆ
|-
|style="text-align:left"|South:||(none)||ㄱ||ㄲ||ㄳ||ㄴ||ㄵ||ㄶ||ㄷ||ㄹ||ㄺ||ㄻ||ㄼ||ㄽ||ㄾ||ㄿ||ㅀ||ㅁ||ㅂ||ㅄ||ㅅ||ㅆ||ㅇ||ㅈ||ㅊ||ㅋ||ㅌ||ㅍ||ㅎ
|}

Pronunciation

The standard languages in the North and the South share the same types and the same number of phonemes, but there are some differences in the actual pronunciations. The South Korean standard pronunciation is based on the dialect as spoken in Seoul, and the North Korean standard pronunciation is based on the dialect as spoken in Pyongyang.

Consonants
The following differences are recognised in the consonants.

But this latter pronunciation was artificially crafted using older pronunciations in the 1960s, so it is common for older speakers to be unable to pronounce initial   and   properly, thus pronouncing such words in the same way as they are pronounced in the South.

Vowels
The following differences are recognised in the vowels. The vowel ㅓ  is not as rounded in the Seoul dialect as it is in the Pyongyang dialect. Due to this roundedness, speakers of the Seoul dialect would find that ㅓ as pronounced by speakers of the Pyongyang dialect sounds close to the vowel ㅗ . It is not well known if this is also happening with the Pyongyang dialect.

Pitch
The pitch patterns in the Pyongyang and Seoul dialects differ, but there has been little research in detail. On the other hand, in the Chosŏnmal Taesajŏn (조선말대사전), published in 1992, where the pitches for certain words are shown in a three-pitch system, a word such as 꾀꼬리 ( – Korean nightingale) is marked as having pitch "232" (where "2" is low and "3" is high), from which one can see some difference in pitch patterns from the Seoul dialect.

Orthography

Inflected words

Informal non-polite suffix 어/여 
In words in which the word stem ends in ㅣ , ㅐ , ㅔ , ㅚ , ㅟ , ㅢ , in forms where -어  is appended to these endings in the South, but -여  is instead appended in the North. In actual pronunciation, however, the  sound often accompanies the pronunciation of such words, even in the South.

Indication of tensed consonants after word endings that end with ㄹ
In word endings where the final consonant is ㄹ , where the South spells -ㄹ까 and -ㄹ쏘냐 to indicate the tensed consonants, in the North these are spelled -ㄹ가 ，-ㄹ소냐  instead. These etymologically are formed by attaching to the adnominal form (관형사형 gwanhyeongsahyeong) that ends in ㄹ, and in the North, the tensed consonants are denoted with normal consonants. Also, the word ending -ㄹ게  used to be spelt -ㄹ께  in the South, but has since been changed in the Hangeul Matchumbeop of 1988, and is now spelt -ㄹ게 just like in the North.

Sino-Korean words

Initial ㄴ / ㄹ (두음법칙[, dueum beopchik], "initial sound rule")

Initial ㄴ  / ㄹ  appearing in Sino-Korean words are kept in the North. In the South, in Sino-Korean words that begin with ㄹ which is followed by the vowel sound  or the semivowel sound  (when ㄹ is followed by one of ㅣ , ㅑ , ㅕ , ㅖ , ㅛ  and ㅠ ), ㄹ is replaced by ㅇ ; when this ㄹ is followed by other vowels it is replaced by ㄴ . In the North, the initial ㄹ is kept.

These are thus pronounced as written in the North as ㄴ  and ㄹ . However, even in the South, sometimes in order to disambiguate the surnames 유 ( Yu ) and 임 ( Im ) from 유 ( Yu ) and 임 ( Im ), the former may be written or pronounced as 류 Ryu and 림 Rim .

Hanja pronunciation

Some hanja characters are pronounced differently.

Also in the North, the hanja  is usually pronounced as  su , except in the word /원쑤 wŏnssu ("enemy"), where it is pronounced as  ssu .

Word stems in compound words
While the general rule is to write out the word stem from which the compound word is formed in its original form, but in cases where the etymological origin is no longer remembered, this is no longer written in original form. This happens both in the North and in the South. However, whether a compound word is seen to have its etymological origin forgotten or not is seen differently by different people:

Conversely, in the second example, the South spelling catches the word as the combination of  beot and  kkot, but in the North, this is no longer recognised and thus the word is written as pronounced as  pŏtkkot.

Spacing
In the South, the rules of spacing are not very clear-cut, but in the North, these are very precise. In general, compared to the North, the writing in the South tends to include more spacing. One likely explanation is that the North remains closer to the Sinitic orthographical heritage, where spacing is less of an issue than with a syllabary or alphabet such as Hangul. The main differences are indicated below.

Bound nouns
Before bound nouns (North: 불완전명사: purwanjŏn myŏngsa/ "incomplete nouns"; South: 의존 명사: / "dependent nouns"), a space is added in the South but not in the North. This applies to counter words also, but the space is sometimes allowed to be omitted in the South.

Auxiliaries
Before auxiliaries, a space is inserted in the South but not in the North. Depending on the situation, however, the space may be omitted in the South.

In the above, in the rules of the South, auxiliaries coming after  or an adnominal form allow the space before them to be omitted, but the space after  cannot be omitted.

Words indicating a single concept
Words formed from two or more words that indicate a single concept in principle are written with spaces in the South and without spaces in the North, as in Chinese and Japanese.

Note that since the spacing rules in the South are often unknown, not followed, or optional, spellings vary from place to place. For example, taking the word  gugeo sajeon, people who see this as two words will add a space, and people who see this as one word will write it without a space. Thus, the spacing depends on how one views what "one word" consists of, and so, while spacing is standardised in the South, in reality the standard does not matter much.

Morphology

Nominal Morphology

Sai siot (사이 시옷, "middle ㅅ -s")
When forming compound words from uninflected words, where the so-called "sai siot" (-ㅅ- interfix), originating from an Old Korean genitive suffix, is inserted in the South. This is left out in the North.

Pronominal Morphology

Second person pronoun 동무 tongmu 
Besides the deferential second person pronoun 당신 tangsin, which is a noun in origin, there is the pronoun 동무 tongmu (plural 동무들 tongmudŭl), from a noun meaning "friend, comrade", in North Korea that may be used when speaking to peers.

Third person feminine pronoun 
The third person feminin pronoun is South Korea is 그녀 geu-nyeo (plural 그녀들 geu-nyeodeul) while in North Korea it is 그 녀자 kŭ nyŏja (plural 그 녀자들 kŭ nyŏjadŭl), both literally meaning "that woman".

Verbal Morphology

Informal polite suffix 오 -o 
In the South, the polite suffixes are 요 /-jo/ after a vowel and 아요/어요 /-ajo, -ʌjo/ after a consonant. In the North, the suffixes 오 /-o/ and 소 /-s͈o/ are appended after a vowel and a consonant respectively. The northern forms of the suffix are older and considered obsolete in South Korea now.

ㅂ p-irregular inflections 
In the South, when the word root of a ㅂ-irregular inflected word has two or more syllables (for example, 고맙다  ), the ㅂ is dropped and replaced with 우 in the next syllable. When conjugated to the polite speech level, the ㅂ-irregular stem resyllabifies with the 어요  conjugation to form 워요  (as in 고맙다  → 고마우  → 고마워요 ), appearing to ignore vowel harmony. ㅂ is not replaced with 우 in the North (as it also was in the South before the 1988 Hangeul Matchumbeop). The vowel harmony is kept in both the South and the North if the word root has only one syllable (for example, 돕다  topta/dopda).

Emphasis

Vocabulary
The standard language in the South (표준어/ pyojuneo) is largely based on the Seoul dialect, and the standard language (문화어/ munhwaŏ) in the North is largely based on the Pyongyang dialect. However, both in the North and in the South, the vocabulary and forms of the standard language come from Sajeonghan Joseoneo Pyojunmal Mo-eum 사정한 조선어 표준말 모음 published by the Korean Language Society in 1936, and so there is very little difference in the basic vocabulary between the standard languages used in the North and the South. Nevertheless, due to the difference in political systems and social structure, each country is constantly adding different words to its vocabulary.

Differences due to the difference in political system or social structure

The word  tongmu/dongmu that is used to mean "friend" in the North was originally used across the whole of Korea, but after the division of Korea, North Korea began to use it as a translation of the Russian term товарищ (friend, comrade), and since then, the word has come to mean "comrade" in the South as well and has fallen out of use there.

Differences in words of foreign origin
South Korea has borrowed a lot of English words, but North Korea has borrowed a number of Russian words, and there are numerous differences in words used between the two coming from these different borrowings. Even when the same English word is borrowed, how this word is transliterated into Korean may differ between the North and the South, resulting in different words being adapted into the corresponding standard languages. For names of other nations and their places, the principle is to base the transliteration on the English word in the South and to base the transliteration on the word in the original language in the North.

Other differences in vocabulary
The other differences between the standard languages in the North and in the South are thought to be caused by the differences between the Seoul and Pyongyang dialects.

Words like  kangnaeng-i and  u are also sometimes heard in various dialects in South Korea.

There are also some words that exist only in the North. The verb   (to break) and its passive form   (to be broken) have no exactly corresponding words in the South.

Problems 
During the 2018 Winter Olympics, the two Korean countries decided to play jointly for the Korea women's national ice hockey team. This led to issues with the South Korean athletes communicating with the North Korean athletes since the former uses English-influenced words in their postwar vocabulary, especially for hockey, while the latter uses only Korean-inspired words for their postwar vocabulary.

The language differences also pose challenges for researchers and for the tens of thousands of people who have defected from the North to the South since the Korean War. The defectors face difficulty and notably discrimination because they lack vocabulary, use differing accents, or have not culturally assimilated yet so may not understand jokes or references to pop culture. South Koreans see the North Korean accent as strange and old-fashioned, making it a constant target of mockery and further exacerbating problems with North Korean integration.

See also
 National Institute of Korean Language (South Korea)
 New Korean Orthography (North Korea)
 Korean language in China
 Koryo-mar

References

Korean language
Korean language in North Korea
Korean language in South Korea
Language comparison between countries
Korean dialects
Communications in Korea
North Korea–South Korea relations

bn:উত্তর কোরিয়ার ভাষা
fr:Coréen#Différence entre le nord et le sud